La Casa Azul (English: The Blue House) is a Spanish indie pop band that combines many of the qualities of 1960s American pop bands like the Beach Boys and 1970s European disco-pop acts like ABBA with clean, clear production reminiscent of Shibuya-kei. This distinctive sound was created by singer and producer Guille Milkyway, who also writes the band's songs. La Casa Azul release their records on the indie-pop label Elefant.

The band virtually consists of five members (David, Virginia, Oscar, Clara and Sergio) who appear in the band's distinctive, retro music videos, though notably do not perform live; instead, Milkyway sings and plays the songs solo at concerts. Milkyway is in fact the sole performer on the records and uses the band "members" (who do not give interviews and whose last names have never been disclosed) in order to project an image. In 2007 when the video of their newest single "La revolución sexual" was released, it was announced that the five members (sometimes called androids) were going to be relegated to some dancing sequences while Milkyway took lead of the band.

Eurovision Song Contest 2008 bid

In 2008, La Casa Azul bid to represent Spain in the Eurovision Song Contest 2008 with the song "La revolución sexual". La Casa Azul got a spot into the final of the Spanish selection process for the Eurovision Song Contest 2008, which would take place in Belgrade on May 24. MySpace altogether with the Spanish Broadcasting Television TVE run a preselection event called Salvemos Eurovisión. More than 530 songs were submitted in which the Internet votes chose five of them and a professional judge the other five finalists. Irregularity was claimed on the Internet vote, in which "La revolución sexual" placed second. La Casa Azul finished third overall in the final.

Discography

Singles
"Como Un Fan" CD (Elefant, 2005).

Albums
El sonido efervescente de la casa azul EP 10"/CD (Elefant, 2000)
Milkyway CD (Elefant, 2002)
Tan simple como el amor LP 12"/CD (Elefant, 2003)
El sonido efervescente de la casa azul (expanded release) CD (Elefant, 2006)
La revolución sexual LP 12"/CD (Elefant, 2007)
La nueva Yma Sumac (lo que nos dejó la revolución) CD (Elefant, 2009)
La Polinesia Meridional CD (Elefant, 2011)
La Gran Esfera LP 12"/CD (Elefant, 2019)

Music videos
"Superguay" (Domingo González, 2004)
"Como un fan" (Domingo González, 2005)
"El sol no brilará nunca más" (Domingo González, 2006)
"La revolución sexual" (Domingo González, 2007)
"Esta noche solo cantan para mí" (Domingo González, 2008)
"La nueva Yma Sumac" (Duprez, 2009)
"Todas tus amigas" (Nadia Mata Portillo, 2010)
"La Polinesia Meridional" (Jean-Marie Marbach, 2012)
"La Fiesta Universal" (Jean-Marie Marbach, 2012)
"A T A R A X I A" (2018)
"Nunca Nadie Pudo Volar" (2018)
"El Final del Amor Eterno" (2019)
"El Momento" (2019)
"Ivy Mike" (2019)

Awards
Goya Award for Best Original Song, 2010, "Yo también" from Yo, también

External links
 Group page at Elefant Records
  Fansite
  Fansite

Spanish pop music groups